Orders, decorations, and medals of the German Empire covers those decorations awarded by the states which came together under Prussian leadership to form the German Empire in 1871.  For convenience's sake, this category also covers the decorations of the various German states which were no longer in existence in 1871, mainly because they had been annexed by Prussia during the Wars of Unification or before.

German Empire

The German Empire consisted of 25 states: four kingdoms, six grand duchies, five duchies, seven principalities and three Hanseatic cities.  In addition, the house order of the Hohenzollern principalities, although the states themselves had been annexed by Prussia, continued to be awarded in the imperial era.  Each state awarded decorations for civil or military merit.  The following is a list of the principal civil and military decorations of each state.

Kingdom of Prussia

Orders
 Order of the Black Eagle
 Order of Merit of the Prussian Crown
 Order of the Red Eagle
 Order of the Crown
 Royal House Order of Hohenzollern
 Pour le Mérite
 Johanniter Order
 Order of Louise
 Wilhelm-Orden

Civil decorations
 Life Saving Medal
 Red Cross Medal
 Merit Cross in Gold or Silver
 Cross of the General Honor Decoration
 General Honor Decoration
 Jerusalem Cross
 Cross of the Mount of Olives, established in 1909

Military and war decorations
 Iron Cross
 Military Merit Cross
 Military Honor Medal 1st Class and Military Honor Medal 2nd Class
 Merit Cross for War Aid
 Duppel Storm Cross
 Alsen Cross
 Warrior Merit Medal
 War Commemorative Medal of 1813/15
 War Commemorative Medal of 1870/71
 1866 Commemorative Cross
 War Commemorative Medal of 1864
 Colonial Medal
 China Medal
 South West Africa Medal
 Centenary Medal

Kingdom of Bavaria
 Orders
 Order of St. Hubertus
 Royal Order of Saint George for the Defense of the Immaculate Conception
 Military Order of Max Joseph
 Merit Order of the Bavarian Crown
 Merit Order of St. Michael
 Military Merit Order and its associated Military Merit Cross
 Maximilian Order for Science and Art
 Ludwig Order
 Military Medical Order
 Order of Saint Elizabeth (for Women)
 Order of Theresa (for Women)
 Civil decorations
 Civil Merit Medal
 Ludwig Medal for Science and Art
 Ludwig Medal for Industry
 Prince Regent Luitpold Medal
 Military and war decorations
 Golden and Silver Military Merit Medals
 Military Medical Decoration
 Merit Cross for Volunteer Medical Personnel
 Jubilee Medal for the Bavarian Army
 King Ludwig Cross

Kingdom of Saxony
 Orders
 Order of the Rue Crown
 Military Order of St. Henry
 Civil Order of Saxony (also called the Civil Merit Order)
 Albert Order
 Order of Sidonia (for women)
 Order of Maria-Anna (for women)
 Civil decorations
 Honor Cross and Honor Cross with Crowns (also a military decoration with swords)
 Lifesaving Medal
 Medal "Virtuti et Ingenio"
 Medal "Bene Merentibus
 Military and war decorations
 Friedrich August Medal
 War Merit Cross

Kingdom of Württemberg

 Orders
 Order of the Crown (Württemberg)
 Military Merit Order
 Friedrich Order
 Order of Olga (for women)
 Civil decorations
 Merit Medal
 Merit Cross
 Gold Medal for Art and Science
 Lifesaving Medal

 Military and war decorations
 Golden Military Merit Medal
 Silver Military Merit Medal
 Merit Cross with Swords
 Wilhelm Cross
 Charlotte Cross

Grand Duchy of Baden
 Orders
 House Order of Fidelity
 Military Karl-Friedrich Merit Order and the Merit Medal of the Military Karl-Friedrich Merit Order (Karl-Friedrich Military Merit Medal)
 Order of Berthold the First
 Order of the Zähringer Lion
 Civil decorations
 Merit Medal
 1902 Jubilee Medal
 Friedrich-Luisen Medal
 1906 Commemorative Medal
 Lifesaving Medals
 Medals for Art and Science
 Military and war decorations
 Merit Medal on the ribbon of the Military Karl-Friedrich Merit Order
 Field Service Decoration
 Commemorative Cross for Volunteer Medical Personnel 1870-71
 Cross for Volunteer War Aid
 War Merit Cross

Grand Duchy of Hesse
 Orders
 Order of the Golden Lion
 Ludwigsorden
 Order of Philip the Magnanimous
 Order of the Star of Brabant
 Civil decorations
 General Honor Decoration
 Lifesaving Medal
 Merit Medals for Science, Art, Industry, and Agriculture
 Military and war decorations
 Military Merit Cross 1870/71
 General Honor Decoration for Bravery or for War Merit
 Warrior Honor Decoration in Iron
 Military Medical Cross, 1870/71 and 1914
 War Honor Decoration

Grand Duchy of Mecklenburg-Schwerin
 Orders
 House Order of the Wendish Crown
 Order of the Griffon
 Civil decorations
 Merit Medal
 Friedrich Franz Medal
 Medal "For Arts and Sciences"
 Military and war decorations
 Military Merit Cross
 Friedrich Franz Cross
 Friedrich Franz Alexandra Cross

Grand Duchy of Mecklenburg-Strelitz
 Orders
 House Order of the Wendish Crown
 Order of the Griffon
 Civil decorations
 Merit Medal
 Military and war decorations
 Cross for Distinction in War

Grand Duchy of Oldenburg
 Orders
 House and Merit Order of Peter Frederick Louis
 Civil decorations
 Civil Merit Medal
 Medal for Merit in the Arts
 Military and war decorations
 Friedrich August Cross
 War Merit Medal

Grand Duchy of Saxe-Weimar-Eisenach
 Orders
 House Order of Vigilance or the White Falcon
 Civil decorations
 Merit Medal (to 1902)
 General Honor Decoration (from 1902)
 Lifesaving Medal
 Military and war decorations
 Wilhelm Ernst War Cross
 General Honor Decoration with Swords Clasp
 Honor Cross for Homeland Merit

Duchy of Anhalt
 Orders
 Order of Albert the Bear
 Order of Merit for Science and Art
 Civil decorations
 1896 Jubilee Medal
 Military and war decorations
 Friedrich Cross

Duchy of Brunswick
 Orders
 House Order of Henry the Lion
 Civil decorations
 Lifesaving Medal
 Military and war decorations
 Peninsula Medal
 Waterloo Medal
 War Merit Cross, 1st and 2nd Classes

Duchies of Saxe-Altenburg, Saxe-Coburg-Gotha and Saxe-Meiningen
 Orders
 Order of the Saxe-Ernestine and its associated merit crosses and medals (the medals were different for each duchy)
 Civil decorations
 Decoration of Honour of the Saxe-Ernestine (Decoration of three grades for women)
 Medal for Art and Science (each duchy had its own version)
 Lifesaving Medal (each duchy had its own version)
 Duke Carl Eduard Medal (Saxe-Coburg-Gotha)
 Military and war decorations
 Duke Ernst Medal (Saxe-Altenburg)
 Duke Ernst Medal 1st Class with Swords (Saxe-Altenburg)
 Oval Silver Duke Carl Eduard Medal with Crown (Saxe-Coburg-Gotha)
 Carl Eduard War Cross (Saxe-Coburg-Gotha)
 Cross for Merit in War and Medal for Merit in War (Saxe-Meiningen)

Principalities of Hohenzollern-Sigmaringen and Hohenzollern-Hechingen
 Orders
 Princely House Order of Hohenzollern
 Bene merenti Order

Principality of Lippe-Detmold
 Orders
 House Order of the Honor Cross
 Order of Leopold
 Lippish Rose Order for Art and Science
 Civil decorations
 Merit Medal
 Lifesaving Medal
 Military and war decorations
 War Honor Cross for Heroic Deeds
 War Merit Cross
 Military Merit Medal
 War Honor Medal

Principality of Schaumburg-Lippe
 Orders
 House Order of the Honor Cross
 Order for Art and Science
 Civil decorations
 Merit Medal
 Lifesaving Medal
 Military and war decorations
 Military Merit Medal
 Cross for Loyal Service

Principalities of Reuss, Elder Line and Younger Line
 Orders
 Princely Reuss Honor Cross
 Civil decorations
 Merit Cross
 Merit Medal
 Lifesaving Medal
 Military and war decorations
 War Merit Cross "1914"
 Medal for Sacrificial Activity in Wartime

Principalities of Schwarzburg-Rudolstadt and Schwarzburg-Sondershausen
 Orders
 Princely Schwarzburg Honor Cross
 Civil decorations
 Merit Medals for Art and Science, Trade and Industry, and Agriculture
 Military and war decorations
 Gold Medal for Merit in War
 Silver Medal for Merit in War
 Bronze Medal for Merit in War
 Medal for Faithful Labour
 Medal for rescue from danger

Principality of Waldeck
 Orders
 Order of Merit
 Merit Cross
 Military Merit Cross
 Civil decorations
 Medal for Art and Science
 Military and war decorations
 Friedrich-Bathildis Medal

Free and Hanseatic Cities of Bremen, Hamburg and Lübeck
 Hanseatic Cross

Former German states

The largest state to be annexed by Prussia was the Kingdom of Hanover.  Other states which had ceased to exist by 1871 include the Duchy of Nassau, the electoral principality of Hesse-Kassel (or Hesse-Cassel), the free city of Frankfurt, and several smaller states.  The following is a list of the principal civil and military decorations of these states.

 Kingdom of Hanover
 Orders
 Order of St. George
 Royal Guelphic Order
 Order of Ernst August
 Civil decorations
 Merit Medal
 General Honor Decoration for Civil Merit
 Golden Honor Medal for Art and Science
 Military and war decorations
 General Honor Decoration for Civil Merit
 Langensalza Medal
 Waterloo Medal
 Electoral Principality of Hesse-Kassel
 Orders
 House Order of the Golden Lion
 Order of Wilhelm
 Order of the Iron Helmet
 Civil decorations
 Civil Merit Cross and Civil Merit Medal
 Duchy of Nassau
 Orders
 Order of the Gold Lion of the House of Nassau
 Military and Civil Merit Order of Adolph of Nassau
 Civil decorations
 Civil Merit Medal
 Medal for Art and Science
 Military and war decorations
 Bravery Medal
 Waterloo Medal

First World War 

German decorations of the First World War were those medals, ribbons, and other decorations bestowed upon German soldiers, sailors, pilots and also for civilians, during the First World War.  These special awards were awarded by both Imperial Germany and various German Kingdoms and other states and city-states of the Reich.

During the Second World War, First World War decorations were commonly displayed on Nazi Party uniforms of the period with such awards intermixed with the more recent awards and decorations of Nazi Germany.

Imperial German badges

 Pilot's Badge
 Observer's Badge
 Imperial Zeppelin Commemorative Badge 
 Air Commemorative Badge
 Air Gunner Badge
 U-Boat War Badge
 Wound Badge

Non-portable awards included the "Honor Goblet for Victors in the Air" and the "National Motor and Air Travel Commendation".

References

 Medals and decorations of Hitler's Germany (Robin Lumsden)